The Hornet's Nest is a 2014 American documentary film about the Afghanistan war, directed by David Salzberg and Christian Tureaud.

The film follows two journalists, Mike Boettcher and Carlos Boettcher (a father and son), embedded with a group of United States Army soldiers from 101st Airborne Division sent on a mission into one of Afghanistan's most hostile valleys. The three-day mission becomes an intense nine days of fighting against the enemy.

Accolades 
The Hornet's Nest won the Chairman's Award at the San Diego Film Festival in 2014.

References

External links

2014 documentary films
2014 films
American documentary films
Documentary films about the War in Afghanistan (2001–2021)
Films about war correspondents
2010s English-language films
2010s American films